The 2021 Pittsburgh Pirates season was the franchise's 140th season overall, 135th season as a member of the National League, and 21st season at PNC Park.  The Pirates suffered another heavily losing season, finishing last in the NL Central with a 0.377 winning percentage, the second-worst in the National League. They were 34 games behind the division-winning Brewers.  One rare highlight from the season was winning a series of games against the playoff-bound Giants, including a 10-2 steamrolling of them at Oracle Park.  

The Pirates had the first overall pick in the 2021 Major League Baseball draft after their weak 2020 season, drafting catcher Henry Davis.  Sports journalists suspect that the team was tanking again in the 2021 season for a high draft spot in the 2022 Major League Baseball draft.

Regular season

Season standings

National League Central

National League playoff standings

Record vs. opponents

Detailed records

Game log 

|- style="background:#bfb;"
| 1 || April 1 || @ Cubs || 5–3 || Howard (1–0) || Hendricks (0–1) || Rodríguez (1) || 10,343 || 1–0 || W1
|- style="background:#fbb;"
| 2 || April 3 || @ Cubs || 1–5 || Arrieta (1–0) || Anderson (0–1) || — || 10,343 || 1–1 || L1
|- style="background:#fbb;"
| 3 || April 4 || @ Cubs || 3–4 || Davies (1–0) || Keller (0–1) || Kimbrel (1) || 10,343 || 1–2 || L2
|- style="background:#fbb;"
| 4 || April 5 || @ Reds || 3–5 || Doolittle (1–0) || Howard (1–1) || Garrett (1) || 9,097 || 1–3 || L3
|- style="background:#fbb;"
| 5 || April 6 || @ Reds || 1–14 || Miley (1–0) || Cahill (0–1) || — || 11,093 || 1–4 || L4
|- style="background:#fbb;"
| 6 || April 7 || @ Reds || 4–11 || Castillo (1–0) || Kuhl (0–1) || — || 11,463 || 1–5 || L5
|- style="background:#fbb;"
| 7 || April 8 || Cubs || 2–4 || Arrieta (2–0) || Anderson (0–2) || Kimbrel (2) || 7,749 || 1–6 || L6
|- style="background:#bfb;"
| 8 || April 10 || Cubs || 8–2 || Keller (1–1) || Davies (1–1) || — || 7,052 || 2–6 || W1
|- style="background:#bfb;"
| 9 || April 11 || Cubs || 7–1 || Brubaker (1–0) || Williams (1–1) || — || 6,851 || 3–6 || W2
|- style="background:#fbb;"
| 10 || April 12 || Padres || 2–6 || Darvish (1–0) || Oviedo (0–1) || — || 4,068 || 3–7 || L1
|- style="background:#bfb;"
| 11 || April 13 || Padres || 8–4 || Stratton (1–0) || Crismatt (0–1) || — || 4,814 || 4–7 || W1
|- style="background:#bfb;"
| 12 || April 14 || Padres || 5–1 || Anderson (1–2) || Musgrove (2–1) || — || 5,228 || 5–7 || W2
|- style="background:#fbb;"
| 13 || April 15 || Padres || 3–8 || Paddack (1–1) || Keller (1–2) || Stammen (1) || 4,023 || 5–8 || L1
|- style="background:#bfb;"
| 14 || April 16 || @ Brewers || 6–1 || Brubaker (2–0) || Houser (1–2) || — || 11,967 || 6–8 || W1
|- style="background:#fbb;"
| 15 || April 17 || @ Brewers || 1–7 || Anderson (2–1) || Cahill (0–2) || — || 12,038 || 6–9 || L1
|- style="background:#bfb;"
| 16 || April 18 || @ Brewers || 6–5  || Rodríguez (1–0) || Feyereisen (0–1) || — || 11,772 || 7–9 || W1
|- style="background:#bbb;"
| — || April 20 || @ Tigers || colspan=7 | Postponed (snow; makeup April 21)
|- style="background:#bfb;"
| 17 || April 21  || @ Tigers || 3–2  || Anderson (2–2) || Fulmer (1–1) || Rodríguez (2) || 7,356 || 8–9 || W2
|- style="background:#fbb;"
| 18 || April 21  || @ Tigers || 2–5  || Turnbull (1–0) || Yajure (0–1) || Soto (2) || 7,461 || 8–10 || L1
|- style="background:#bfb;"
| 19 || April 22 || @ Tigers || 4–2 || Howard (2–1) || Cisnero (0–1) || Rodríguez (3) || 7,314 || 9–10 || W1
|- style="background:#fbb;"
| 20 || April 23 || @ Twins || 0–2 || Happ (1–0) || Brubaker (2–1) || Rogers (1) || 9,541 || 9–11 || L1
|- style="background:#bfb;" 
| 21 || April 24 || @ Twins || 6–2 || Cahill (1–2) || Pineda (1–1) || — || 9,718 || 10–11 || W1
|- style="background:#bfb;" 
| 22 || April 25 || @ Twins || 6–2 || Holmes (1–0) || Shoemaker (1–2) || — || 9,396 || 11–11 || W2
|- style="background:#bfb;"
| 23 || April 27 || Royals || 2–1 || Underwood Jr. (1–0) || Junis (1–1) || Rodríguez (4) || 5,510 || 12–11 || W3
|- style="background:#fbb;" 
| 24 || April 28 || Royals || 6–9 || Zimmer (2–0) || Keller (1–3) || Staumont (3) || 4,226 || 12–12 || L1
|- style="background:#fbb;" 
| 25 || April 30 || Cardinals || 3–7 || Gant (2–2) || Brubaker (2–2) || — || 5,953 || 12–13 || L2
|-

|- style="background:#fbb;"
| 26 || May 1 || Cardinals || 5–12 || Flaherty (5–0) || Cahill (1–3) || — || 7,331 || 12–14 || L3
|- style="background:#fbb;" 
| 27 || May 2 || Cardinals || 0–3 || Martínez (2–4) || Crowe (0–1) || Reyes (7) || 7,343 || 12–15 || L4
|- style="background:#fbb;" 
| 28 || May 3 || @ Padres || 0–2 || Hill (2–2) || Anderson (2–3) || Melancon (10) || 15,250 || 12–16 || L5
|- style="background:#bfb;"
| 29 || May 4 || @ Padres || 2–1 || Keller (2–3) || Weathers (1–1) || Rodríguez (5) || 15,250 || 13–16 || W1
|- style="background:#fbb;" 
| 30 || May 5 || @ Padres || 2–4 || Stammen (2–1) || Underwood Jr. (1–1) || Melancon (11) || 15,250 || 13–17 || L1
|- style="background:#fbb;"
| 31 || May 7 || @ Cubs || 2–3 || Davies (2–2) || Cahill (1–4) || Brothers (1) || 10,343 || 13–18 || L2
|- style="background:#fbb;"
| 32 || May 8 || @ Cubs || 2–3 || Thompson (1–0) || Howard (2–2) || Kimbrel (6) || 10,343 || 13–19 || L3
|- style="background:#bfb;" 
| 33 || May 9 || @ Cubs || 6–5 || Anderson (3–3) || Hendricks (2–4) || Rodríguez (6) || 10,343 || 14–19 || W1
|- style="background:#fbb;" 
| 34 || May 10 || Reds || 1–14 || Mahle (2–1) || Keller (2–4) || — || 4,065 || 14–20 || L1
|- style="background:#bfb;" 
| 35 || May 11 || Reds || 7–2 || Brubaker (3–2) || Hoffman (2–3) || — || 4,049 || 15–20 || W1
|- style="background:#fbb;" 
| 36 || May 12 || Reds || 1–5  || Sims (2–1) || Underwood Jr. (1–2) || — || 4,515 || 15–21 || L1
|- style="background:#fbb;"
| 37 || May 13 || Giants || 1–3 || DeSclafani (3–1) || Crowe (0–2) || Rogers (3) || 4,099 || 15–22 || L2
|- style="background:#bfb;" 
| 38 || May 14 || Giants || 3–2  || Oviedo (1–1) || Baragar (2–1) || — || 6,743 || 16–22 || W1
|- style="background:#bfb;"
| 39 || May 15 || Giants || 8–6 || Rodríguez (2–0) || McGee (1–1) || — || 7,833 || 17–22 || W2
|- style="background:#fbb;"
| 40 || May 16 || Giants || 1–4 || Wood (5–0) || Keller (2–5) || Rogers (4) || 7,356 || 17–23 || L1
|- style="background:#fbb;" 
| 41 || May 18 || @ Cardinals || 2–5 || Gant (3–3) || Brubaker (3–3) || Reyes (12) || 14,005 || 17–24 || L2
|- style="background:#fbb;" 
| 42 || May 19 || @ Cardinals || 5–8 || Flaherty (8–0) || Cahill (1–5) || Reyes (13) || 14,677 || 17–25 || L3
|- style="background:#bfb;" 
| 43 || May 20 || @ Braves || 6–4  || Rodríguez (3–0) || Webb (1–2) || — || 21,430 || 18–25 || W1
|- style="background:#fbb;" 
| 44 || May 21 || @ Braves || 1–20 || Anderson (4–1) || Anderson (3–4) || — || 37,545 || 18–26 || L1
|- style="background:#fbb;" 
| 45 || May 22 || @ Braves || 1–6 || Wilson (2–2) || Keller (2–6) || — || 40,068 || 18–27 || L2
|- style="background:#fbb;" 
| 46 || May 23 || @ Braves || 1–7 || Fried (2–2) || Brubaker (3–4) || — || 39,874 || 18–28 || L3
|- style="background:#fbb;" 
| 47 || May 25 || Cubs || 3–4 || Arrieta (5–4) || Ponce (0–1) || Kimbrel (10) || 6,750 || 18–29 || L4
|- style="background:#fbb;" 
| 48 || May 26 || Cubs || 1–4 || Williams (3–2) || Crowe (0–3) || Kimbrel (11) || 5,660 || 18–30 || L5
|- style="background:#fbb;" 
| 49 || May 27 || Cubs || 3–5 || Hendricks (5–4) || Anderson (3–5) || Tepera (1) || 7,202 || 18–31 || L6
|- style="background:#bbb;"
| — || May 28 || Rockies || colspan=7 | Postponed (rain; makeup May 29)
|- style="background:#bfb;" 
| 50 || May 29  || Rockies || 7–0  || Brubaker (4–4) || Gray (4–5) || — || 5,279 || 19–31 || W1
|- style="background:#bfb;" 
| 51 || May 29  || Rockies || 4–0  || Keller (3–6) || Gomber (3–5) || — || 7,183 || 20–31 || W2
|- style="background:#fbb;" 
| 52 || May 30 || Rockies || 3–4 || Bard (3–3) || Rodríguez (3–1) || — || 7,917 || 20–32 || L1
|- style="background:#fbb;" 
| 53 || May 31 || @ Royals || 3–7 || Minor (4–2) || Kuhl (0–2) || — || 12,604 || 20–33 || L2
|-

|- style="background:#fbb;" 
| 54 || June 1 || @ Royals || 5–10 || Singer (3–4) || Crowe (0–4) || — || 10,333 || 20–34 || L3
|- style="background:#bfb;" 
| 55 || June 3 || Marlins || 5–3 || Crick (1–0) || Floro (2–3) || Rodríguez (7) || 4,192 || 21–34 || W1
|- style="background:#bfb;"
| 56 || June 4 || Marlins || 9–2 || Underwood Jr. (2–2) || Poteet (2–2) || Stratton (1) || 8,044 || 22–34 || W2
|- style="background:#bfb;" 
| 57 || June 5 || Marlins || 8–7  || Holmes (2–0) || Cimber (1–2) || — || 8,714 || 23–34 || W3
|- style="background:#fbb;" 
| 58 || June 6 || Marlins || 1–3 || Alcántara (3–5) || Kuhl (0–3) || García (10) || 5,477 || 23–35 || L1
|- style="background:#fbb;" 
| 59 || June 8 || Dodgers || 3–5 || Buehler (5–0) || Brubaker (4–5) || Jansen (13) || 9,047 || 23–36 || L2
|- style="background:#fbb;" 
| 60 || June 9 || Dodgers || 1–2 || González (3–0) || Anderson (3–6) || Jansen (14) || 10,957 || 23–37 || L3
|- style="background:#fbb;" 
| 61 || June 10 || Dodgers || 3–6  || Urías (9–2) || Keller (3–7) || Bickford (1) || 9,396 || 23–38 || L4
|- style="background:#fbb;" 
| 62 || June 11 || @ Brewers || 4–7 || Woodruff (5–2) || Holmes (2–1) || Hader (15) || 17,678 || 23–39 || L5
|- style="background:#fbb;"
| 63 || June 12 || @ Brewers || 4–7 || Richards (1–0) || Kuhl (0–4) || Hader (16) || 20,126 || 23–40 || L6
|- style="background:#fbb;" 
| 64 || June 13 || @ Brewers || 2–5 || Suter (8–3) || Bednar (0–1) || Hader (17) || 20,545 || 23–41 || L7
|- style="background:#fbb;" 
| 65 || June 14 || @ Nationals || 2–3 || Finnegan (3–2) || Holmes (2–2) || Hand (12) || 14,859 || 23–42 || L8
|- style="background:#fbb;" 
| 66 || June 15 || @ Nationals || 1–8 || Corbin (4–5) || Anderson (3–7) || — || 16,886 || 23–43 || L9
|- style="background:#fbb;"
| 67 || June 16 || @ Nationals || 1–3 || Espino (1–2) || De Jong (0–1) || Hand (13) || 16,781 || 23–44 || L10
|- style="background:#bfb;" 
| 68 || June 18 || Indians || 11–10 || Kuhl (1–4) || Mejía (1–2) || Rodríguez (8) || 16,965 || 24–44 || W1
|- style="background:#bfb;" 
| 69 || June 19 || Indians || 6–3 || Stratton (2–0) || Shaw (1–2) || — || 16,830 || 25–44 || W2
|- style="background:#fbb;"
| 70 || June 20 || Indians || 1–2 || Maton (2–0) || Brubaker (4–6) || Karinchak (8) || 16,582 || 25–45 || L1
|- style="background:#bfb;" 
| 71 || June 22 || White Sox || 6–3 || Bednar (1–1) || Crochet (2–4) || Rodríguez (9) || 9,847 || 26–45 || W1
|- style="background:#fbb;" 
| 72 || June 23 || White Sox || 3–4 || Cease (6–3) || De Jong (0–2) || Hendriks (19) || 10,406 || 26–46 || L1
|- style="background:#bfb;" 
| 73 || June 24 || @ Cardinals || 8–2 || Kuhl (2–4) || Martínez (3–9) || — || 33,254 || 27–46 || W1
|- style="background:#bfb;" 
| 74 || June 25 || @ Cardinals || 5–4 || Crowe (1–4) || Woodford (1–1) || Rodríguez (10) || 34,812 || 28–46 || W2
|- style="background:#fbb;" 
| 75 || June 26 || @ Cardinals || 1–3 || Wainwright (6–5) || Brubaker (4–7) || Reyes (18) || 33,058 || 28–47 || L1
|- style="background:#bfb;" 
| 76 || June 27 || @ Cardinals || 7–2 || Kranick (1–0) || Oviedo (0–4) || — || 25,163 || 29–47 || W1
|- style="background:#fbb;" 
| 77 || June 28 || @ Rockies || 0–2 || Freeland (1–2) || Anderson (3–8) || Bard (11) || 32,092 || 29–48 || L1
|- style="background:#fbb;" 
| 78 || June 29 || @ Rockies || 0–8 || Márquez (7–6) || De Jong (0–3) || — || 27,915 || 29–49 || L2
|- style="background:#fbb;" 
| 79 || June 30 || @ Rockies || 2–6 || Gray (5–6) || Kuhl (2–5) || — || 20,270 || 29–50 || L3
|-

|- style="background:#fbb;" 
| 80 || July 1 || Brewers || 2–7 || Burnes (4–4) || Crowe (1–5) || — || 11,074 || 29–51 || L4
|- style="background:#fbb;" 
| 81 || July 2 || Brewers || 2–7 || Houser (5–5) || Brubaker (4–8) || — || 15,421 || 29–52 || L5
|- style="background:#fbb;"  
| 82 || July 3 || Brewers || 2–11 || Lauer (3–3) || Ponce (0–2) || — || 17,451 || 29–53 || L6
|- style="background:#bfb;" 
| 83 || July 4 || Brewers || 2–0 || Anderson (4–8) || Peralta (7–3) || Rodríguez (11) || 12,527 || 30–53 || W1
|- style="background:#bfb;" 
| 84 || July 5 || Braves || 11–1 || De Jong (1–3) || Fried (5–5) || — || 11,600 || 31–53 || W2
|- style="background:#bfb;" 
| 85 || July 6 || Braves || 2–1 || Rodríguez (4–1) || Matzek (0–3) || — || 10,844 || 32–53 || W3
|- style="background:#fbb;" 
| 86 || July 7 || Braves || 3–14 || Smyly (7–3) || Crick (1–1) || — || 10,094 || 32–54 || L1
|- style="background:#bbb;" 
| — || July 8 || @ Mets || colspan=7 | Postponed (rain; makeup July 10)
|- style="background:#fbb;" 
| 87 || July 9 || @ Mets || 4–13 || Loup (3–0) || Brubaker (4–9) || — || 20,350 || 32–55 || L2
|- style="background:#bfb;"
| 88 || July 10  || @ Mets || 6–2  || Anderson (5–8) || Stroman (6–7) || — || N/A || 33–55 || W1
|- style="background:#fbb;"
| 89 || July 10  || @ Mets || 2–4  || Familia (4–1) || Kranick (1–1) || Díaz (19) || 31,924 || 33–56 || L1
|- style="background:#bfb;" 
| 90 || July 11 || @ Mets || 6–5 || Bednar (2–1) || Díaz (3–3) || Rodríguez (12) || 26,420 || 34–56 || W1
|-style=background:#bbbfff 
|colspan=10|91st All-Star Game in Denver, CO
|- style="background:#bfb;" 
| 91 || July 16 || Mets || 4–1 || Kuhl (3–5) || Stroman (6–8) || Rodríguez (13) || 18,119 || 35–56 || W2
|- style="background:#bfb;" 
| 92 || July 17 || Mets || 9–7 || Holmes (3–2) || Díaz (3–4) || — || 27,222 || 36–56 || W3
|- style="background:#fbb;" 
| 93 || July 18 || Mets || 6–7 || Familia (5–1) || Rodríguez (4–2) || May (2) || 17,837 || 36–57 || L1
|- style="background:#fbb;" 
| 94 || July 19 || @ Diamondbacks || 2–4 || Smith (3–6) || De Jong (1–4) || Soria (5) || 9,173 || 36–58 || L2
|- style="background:#fbb;" 
| 95 || July 20 || @ Diamondbacks || 6–11 || Bukauskas (2–2) || Davis (0–1) || — || 7,283 || 36–59 || L3
|- style="background:#fbb;" 
| 96 || July 21 || @ Diamondbacks || 4–6 || de Geus (2–0) || Underwood Jr. (2–3) || Soria (6) || 7,863 || 36–60 || L4
|- style="background:#bfb;" 
| 97 || July 23 || @ Giants || 6–4 || Stratton (3–0) || Leone (2–1) || Rodríguez (14) || 26,579 || 37–60 || W1
|- style="background:#bfb;" 
| 98 || July 24 || @ Giants || 10–2 || Crowe (2–5) || Gausman (9–4) || — || 30,780 || 38–60 || W2
|- style="background:#fbb;" 
| 99 || July 25 || @ Giants || 1–6 || Wood (9–3) || Brubaker (4–10) || — || 30,303 || 38–61 || L1
|- style="background:#fbb;"  
| 100 || July 27 || Brewers || 0–9 || Anderson (3–5) || Oviedo (1–2) || — || 10,618 || 38–62 || L2
|- style="background:#fbb;" 
| 101 || July 28 || Brewers || 3–7 || Houser (7–5) || Kranick (1–2) || — || 10,204 || 38–63 || L3
|- style="background:#fbb;" 
| 102 || July 29 || Brewers || 0–12 || Peralta (8–3) || Kuhl (3–6) || — || 10,503 || 38–64 || L4
|- style="background:#bfb;"
| 103 || July 30 || Phillies || 7–0 || Crowe (3–5) || Velasquez (3–6) || — || 20,591 || 39–64 || W1
|- style="background:#bfb;"
| 104 || July 31 || Phillies || 3–2 || Stratton (4–0) || Alvarado (6–1) || — || 32,071 || 40–64 || W2
|-

|- style="background:#fbb;" 
| 105 || August 1 || Phillies || 4–15 || Gibson (7–3) || Keller (3–8) || — || 17,875 || 40–65 || L1
|- style="background:#fbb;" 
| 106 || August 2 || @ Brewers || 2–6 || Lauer (4–4) || Wilson (2–4) || Boxberger (4) || 23,563 || 40–66 || L2
|- style="background:#bfb;" 
| 107 || August 3 || @ Brewers || 8–5  || Bednar (3–1) || Hardy (0–1) || — || 24,902 || 41–66 || W1
|- style="background:#fbb;" 
| 108 || August 4 || @ Brewers || 2–4 || Suter (10–5) || Keller (0–1) || Williams (1) || 28,003 || 41–67 || L1
|- style="background:#fbb;" 
| 109 || August 5 || @ Reds || 4–7 || Gray (4–6) || Crowe (3–6) || Givens (1) || 19,393 || 41–68 || L2
|- style="background:#fbb;" 
| 110 || August 6 || @ Reds || 0–10 || Miley (9–4) || Brubaker (4–11) || — || 27,804 || 41–69 || L3
|- style="background:#fbb;" 
| 111 || August 7 || @ Reds || 3–11 || Gutiérrez (7–3) || Keller (3–9) || — || 31,297 || 41–70 || L4
|- style="background:#fbb;" 
| 112 || August 8 || @ Reds || 2–3 || Mahle (9–3) || Wilson (2–5) || Givens (2) || 23,740 || 41–71 || L5
|- style="background:#fbb;" 
| 113 || August 10 || Cardinals || 1–4 || Happ (6–6) || Brault (0–1) || Reyes (26) || 10,056 || 41–72 || L6
|- style="background:#fbb;" 
| 114 || August 11 || Cardinals || 0–4 || Wainwright (11–6) || Crowe (3–7) || — || 8,548 || 41–73 || L7
|- style="background:#fbb;" 
| 115 || August 12 || Cardinals || 6–7 || McFarland (2–0) || Brubaker (4–12) || Reyes (27) || 8,676 || 41–74 || L8
|- style="background:#bbb;" 
| — || August 13 || Brewers || colspan=7 | Postponed (rain; makeup August 14)
|- style="background:#bfb;" 
| 116 || August 14  || Brewers || 14–4  || Shreve (1–0) || Anderson (4–6) || — || 16,991 || 42–74 || W1
|- style="background:#fbb;"
| 117 || August 14  || Brewers || 0–6  || Boxberger (5–3) || Keller (3–10) || — || 24,081 || 42–75 || L1
|- style="background:#fbb;" 
| 118 || August 15 || Brewers || 1–2 || Suter (12–5) || Peters (0–1) || Hader (23) || 12,001 || 42–76 || L2
|- style="background:#fbb;"  
| 119 || August 16 || @ Dodgers || 1–2 || Treinen (3–5) || Shreve (1–1) || Jansen (24) || 48,005 || 42–77 || L3
|- style="background:#fbb;" 
| 120 || August 17 || @ Dodgers || 3–4 || Knebel (2–0) || Ponce (0–3) || Jansen (25) || 53,114 || 42–78 || L4
|- style="background:#fbb;"  
| 121 || August 18 || @ Dodgers ||  0–9 || White (1–1) || Brubaker (4–13) || — || 52,140 || 42–79 || L5
|- style="background:#bfb;" 
| 122 || August 20 || @ Cardinals || 4–0 || Keller (4–10) || Mikolas (0–1) || — || 28,406 || 43–79 || W1
|- style="background:#bfb;"  
| 123 || August 21 || @ Cardinals || 5–4 || Shreve (2–1) || Cabrera (2–4) || Bednar (1) || 30,205 || 44–79 || W2
|- style="background:#fbb;" 
| 124 || August 22 || @ Cardinals || 0–3 || Wainwright (12–7) || Brault (0–2) || Reyes (28) || 34,431 || 44–80 || L1
|- style="background:#bfb;"
| 125 || August 23 || Diamondbacks || 6–5 || Banda (2–0) || Ramirez (0–1) || Bednar (2) || 8,596 || 45–80 || W1
|- style="background:#bfb;" 
| 126 || August 24 || Diamondbacks || 4–2 || Brubaker (5–13) || Bumgarner (7–8) || Stratton (2) || 8,478 || 46–80 || W2
|- style="background:#fbb;" 
| 127 || August 25 || Diamondbacks || 2–5 || de Geus (3–2) || Banda (2–1) || Clippard (5) || 8,357 || 46–81 || L1
|- style="background:#bfb;" 
| 128 || August 26 || Cardinals || 11–7 || Kuhl (4–6) || Cabrera (2–5) || — || 8,618 || 47–81 || W1
|- style="background:#fbb;" 
| 129 || August 27 || Cardinals || 3–4 || Happ (8–6) || Peters (0–2) || Reyes (29) || 12,662 || 47–82 || L1
|- style="background:#fbb;" 
| 130 || August 28 || Cardinals || 0–13 || Wainwright (13–7) || Brault (0–3) || — || 20,043 || 47–83 || L2
|- style="background:#bfb;" 
| 131 || August 29 || Cardinals || 4–3 || Stratton (5–0) || Reyes (5–7) || — || 10,290 || 48–83 || W1
|- style="background:#fbb;" 
| 132 || August 31 || @ White Sox || 2–4 || Kopech (4–2) || Wilson (2–6) || Hendriks (30) || 19,221 || 48–84 || L1
|-

|- style="background:#fbb;" 
| 133 || September 1 || @ White Sox || 3–6 || Rodón (11–5) || Kranick (1–3) || Hendriks (31) || 19,231 || 48–85 || L2
|- style="background:#fbb;" 
| 134 || September 2 || @ Cubs || 5–6  || Heuer (6–2) || Howard (2–3) || — || 26,963 || 48–86 || L3
|- style="background:#fbb;"
| 135 || September 3 || @ Cubs || 5–6 ||  Megill (1–0) || Miller (0–1) || Wick (2) || 24,441 || 48–87 || L4
|- style="background:#fbb;" 
| 136 || September 4 || @ Cubs || 6–7 || Effross (1–0) || Stratton (5–1) || — || 30,020 || 48–88 || L5
|- style="background:#fbb;" 
| 137 || September 5 || @ Cubs || 8–11 || Alzolay (5–13) || Howard (2–4) || Wick (3) || 30,155 || 48–89 || L6
|- style="background:#bfb;" 
| 138 || September 6 || Tigers || 6–3 || Shreve (3–1) || Funkhouser (6–3) || Bednar (3) || 11,141 || 49–89 || W1
|- style="background:#bfb;" 
| 139 || September 7 || Tigers || 3–2 || Howard (3–4) || Lange (0–2) || Stratton (3) || 8,329 || 50–89 || W2
|- style="background:#fbb;" 
| 140 || September 8 || Tigers || 1–5 || Hutchison (1–1) || Keller (4–11) || — || 8,382 || 50–90 || L1
|- style="background:#bfb;" 
| 141 || September 10 || Nationals || 4–3 || Kuhl (5–6) || Murphy (0–2) || — || 11,808 || 51–90 || W1
|- style="background:#bfb;" 
| 142 || September 11 || Nationals || 10–7 || Keller (1–1) || Baldonado (0–1) || Stratton (4) || 17,993 || 52–90 || W2
|- style="background:#fbb;" 
| 143 || September 12 || Nationals || 2–6 || Corbin (8–14) || Wilson (2–7) || Finnegan (9) || 9,714 || 52–91 || L1
|- style="background:#bfb;" 
| 144 || September 14 || Reds || 6–5 || Peters (1–2) || Miley (12–6) || Stratton (5) || 8,896 || 53–91 || W1
|- style="background:#bfb;"
| 145 || September 15 || Reds || 5–4 || Stratton (6–1) || Givens (3–3) || — || 9,320 || 54–91 || W2
|- style="background:#fbb;" 
| 146 || September 16 || Reds || 0–1 || Mahle (12–5) || Ponce (0–4) || Givens (8) || 9,102 || 54–92 || L1
|- style="background:#bfb;"
| 147 || September 17 || @ Marlins || 2–1 || Crowe (4–7) || Hernández (1–2) || Stratton (6) || 7,884 || 55–92 || W1
|- style="background:#bfb;" 
| 148 || September 18 || @ Marlins || 6–3 || Wilson (3–7) || Cabrera (0–2) || — || 12,300 || 56–92 || W2
|- style="background:#fbb;" 
| 149 || September 19 || @ Marlins || 5–6  || Okert (2–1) || Kuhl (5–7) || — || 9,870 || 56–93 || L1
|- style="background:#fbb;" 
| 150 || September 20 || @ Reds || 5–9 || Cessa (5–2) || Ponce (0–5) || — || 17,086 || 56–94 || L2
|- style="background:#bfb;" 
| 151 || September 21 || @ Reds || 6–2 || Keller (5–11) || Mahle (12–6) || — || 9,475 || 57–94 || W1
|- style="background:#bbb;" 
| — || September 22 || @ Reds || colspan=7 | Postponed (rain, makeup September 27)
|- style="background:#fbb;" 
| 152 || September 23 || @ Phillies || 6–12 || Nola (9–8) || Banda (2–2) || — || 16,154 || 57–95 || L1
|- style="background:#fbb;" 
| 153 || September 24 || @ Phillies || 6–8 || Neris (4–6) || Shreve (3–2) || Kennedy (26) || 20,548 || 57–96 || L2
|- style="background:#fbb;" 
| 154 || September 25 || @ Phillies || 0–3 || Suárez (7–5) || Crowe (4–8) || — || 28,135 || 57–97 || L3
|- style="background:#bfb;" 
| 155 || September 26 || @ Phillies || 6–0 || Kranick (2–3) || Crouse (0–1) || — || 29,336 || 58–97 || W1
|- style="background:#fbb;" 
| 156 || September 27 || @ Reds || 1–13 || Sanmartín (1–0) || Overton (0–1) || — || 11,055 || 58–98 || L1
|- style="background:#bfb;" 
| 157 || September 28 || Cubs || 8–6 || De Los Santos (2–1) || Morgan (1–1) || Stratton (7) || 9,218 || 59–98 || W1
|- style="background:#fbb;" 
| 158 || September 29 || Cubs || 2–3 || Morgan (2–1) || Shreve (3–3) || Heuer (2) || 9,236 || 59–99 || L1
|- style="background:#fbb;" 
| 159 || September 30 || Cubs || 0–9 || Steele (4–4) || Yajure (0–2) || — || 10,152 || 59–100 || L2
|- style="background:#bfb;" 
| 160 || October 1 || Reds || 9–2 || Stratton (7–1) || Garrett (0–4) || — || 13,582 || 60–100 || W1
|- style="background:#bfb;" 
| 161 || October 2 || Reds || 8–6 || Mears (1–0) || Santillan (1–3) || Stratton (8) || 22,910 || 61–100 || W2
|- style="background:#fbb;" 
| 162 || October 3 || Reds || 3–6 || Sanmartin (2–0) || Ponce (0–6) || — || 13,011 || 61–101 || L1
|-

|- style="text-align:center;"
| Legend:       = Win       = Loss       = PostponementBold = Pirates team member

Notable games
On May 27 in a game against the Chicago Cubs with Cubs catcher Willson Contreras on second base and Javier Báez at the plate with 2 outs, Baez hit a ground ball to third basemen Erik González who made a wide throw to first basemen Will Craig. Instead of touching first, Craig decided to chase down Baez back to home plate. With Contreras coming home, Craig tried to toss the ball to the catcher Michael Pérez.  Contreras beat the throw and was able to score. With Baez going back to first, Perez tried to throw it to first, but Adam Frazier was late to cover the bag and the ball sailed into right field. Baez decided to head to second in which the Pirates tried to throw him out at second but the throw wasn't in time. The play was ruled as 2 errors: one by Craig and the other by Perez.

Roster

Farm system

Notes

References

External links
Pittsburgh Pirates 2021 schedule at MLB.com

Pittsburgh Pirates seasons
Pittsburgh Pirates
Pittsburgh Pirates
2020s in Pittsburgh